Linyovo is the name of several localities in Russia:
Linyovo, Novosibirsk Oblast, an urban-type settlement in Iskitimsky District in Novosibirsk Oblast; 
Linyovo, Volgograd Oblast, an work settlement in Zhirnovsky District in Volgograd Oblast.